Meise is a municipality located in the Belgian province of Flemish Brabant. The municipality comprises the towns of Meise proper and Wolvertem (a deelgemeente), and, several smaller villages like Sint-Brixius-Rode, Oppem, Meusegem, Impde/Imde, Rossem, Westrode and quarters as Bouchout, Nerom and Slozen. As of January 1, 2006, Meise had a total population of 18,464. The total area is 34.82 km² which gives a population density of 530 inhabitants per km².

Meise is also a last name of a few families originating from Germany.

Transport
The A12 runs vertically through the middle of Meise.

Points of interest 
 Wolvertem transmitter, a facility for AM broadcasting
 Botanic Garden Meise
 Bouchout Castle

Notable people from Meise 
Some of Meise's most famous inhabitants are
 Eddy Merckx
 
 Tony De Pauw
 Kris Wauters (from the band Clouseau)
 Jean-Pierre Van Rossem

Empress Carlota of Mexico (born the first Belgian princess) spent many secluded years at the Castle of Bouchout where she died in 1927.

Twin towns
  Waalre, since 1980

References

External links 
 
  

Municipalities of Flemish Brabant